South Park Conservatives: The Revolt Against Liberal Media Bias is a book written by Brian C. Anderson. It explores the idea that the traditional mass media in the United States are biased towards liberals, but through new media, such as the Internet, cable television, and talk radio, conservatives are slowly gaining some power in the world of information. The name South Park Conservatives derives from Andrew Sullivan's term, "South Park Republican."

See also
Subject matter in South Park

References

2005 non-fiction books
Books about politics of the United States
South Park
Books about media bias
Books critical of modern liberalism in the United States